Aenus may refer to:

 Aenus (Thrace), an ancient city
 Inn River (Latin: Aenus)
 Mount Ainos (alternative spelling)